Arthur Morgan is a fictional character and the main playable protagonist of the 2018 video game Red Dead Redemption 2. A high-ranking member of the Van der Linde gang, Arthur must deal with the decline of the Wild West while attempting to survive against government forces and other adversaries in a fictionalized representation of the American frontier. He is portrayed by Roger Clark through performance capture.

Rockstar Games decided to focus Red Dead Redemption 2 on one character, in order to follow him more personally. They felt that this was more appropriate for the narrative structure of a Western. Clark wanted to play Arthur in a manner that was complex enough for the player to choose his path and still make sense. He took inspiration from actors such as Toshiro Mifune, John Wayne, and Rob Wiethoff, who played John Marston in the game and its predecessor.

Arthur has received acclaim from critics, with his complexity and path to redemption most frequently the subject of praise. Reviewers also lauded him for bringing the world and other characters to life. For his work, Clark accrued numerous nominations and was awarded Best Performance at The Game Awards.

Character development 
The development team at Rockstar Games determined that there would be one character to control in Red Dead Redemption 2, as opposed to the three protagonists in Rockstar's previous title Grand Theft Auto V (2013), to better understand how the events affect him. They also saw that the narrative structure of a Western necessitated a single perspective.

Actor Roger Clark played Arthur Morgan in Red Dead Redemption 2. The performance capture process involved simultaneous recording of movement and speech, while a small part was done in a voice-over booth. Researching the role, Clark's main inspiration came from Toshiro Mifune, whose characters' stoic but humorous demeanor held intricacies he wanted in Arthur. Clark gained insight from The Proposition (2005) as it contained a similar character arc as that of Arthur. He watched films such as High Noon (1952), as well as the work of John Wayne; despite viewing the Dollars Trilogy (1964–1966) he did not derive much from Clint Eastwood's depiction of the Man with No Name because he felt that Arthur was more talkative. Clark regularly listened to Don Edwards' 1993 version of the song  during production.

Clark wanted his portrayal to be complex enough for the player to make decisions without them feeling uncharacteristic. He initially faced difficulty with this concept, as the high honor execution was different from the low honor, but he realized that Arthur was someone who could easily contradict himself. Aiming to show the vulnerability of Arthur's ego, Clark observed that the resentment of John Marston for having a family fell apart as he eventually sought to help them. Rob Wiethoff's performance as John in the first game influenced his own. A second love interest for Arthur was cut for want of a desired effect.

Writer Dan Houser was interested in subverting the trope of the lead starting as weak and becoming stronger as the story progresses; instead, Arthur is already tough at the beginning of the game, and is "taken on a more intellectual roller coaster when his world view gets taken apart". He felt that the decline of the American frontier had a deep effect on Arthur, noting that the character is "caught between the nastiness of nature and the brutality of encroaching industrialization in civilization". Houser avoided meeting Clark on set to avoid hearing his real voice.

Fictional character biography 
Arthur joined Dutch van der Linde's gang when he was fourteen, having lost his parents at a young age, and soon became Dutch's first protégé. Arthur had a son, Isaac, with a waitress named Eliza; he demonstrated regular support for them until they were killed in a robbery. Over time, Arthur transformed into Dutch's most dedicated enforcer.

When an unsuccessful ferry heist leaves them with no choice but to flee across the mountains, Arthur helps to find supplies and later tracks down fellow gang member John Marston. He helps rob a train owned by oil tycoon Leviticus Cornwall and, after moving to Horseshoe Overlook, fights against Cornwall's hired mercenaries. Leaving for Clemens Point, Arthur becomes involved in a conflict between two warring families, the Braithwaites and the Grays, leading to the capture of John's son, Jack. Arthur retrieves Jack from the supervision of crime lord Angelo Bronte and helps retaliate against Bronte after he ushered them into a trap. After Bronte is captured, Dutch drowns him; Arthur notices Dutch's violent outburst as uncharacteristic of him. In Saint Denis, a failed bank heist forces some group members out of town; Arthur is shipwrecked with others on Guarma, an island near Cuba, but battles alongside a revolutionary in exchange for a ship back to the mainland. Reuniting with the rest, Arthur resolves to save the now captured John, much to the disdain of Dutch. Shortly afterward, Arthur becomes ill and faints, falling from his horse. After visiting a doctor, he is diagnosed with tuberculosis. Shocked by the grim reality of his imminent death, he starts reflecting on decisions and morals, led further by his friendship with Native American leader Rains Fall. This drives his desire to protect the remnants of the gang, particularly John and his family. Upon saving John from prison, Arthur reveals his doubts about Dutch, unable to accept his leader's growing obsessions.

Dutch seemingly abandons Arthur during an assault on an oil refinery and leaves John for dead when he is shot during a train robbery. When Dutch ignores Arthur's plea to rescue John's wife Abigail from Pinkerton detectives, Arthur disavows the gang. Upon confronting them, Arthur discovers that Micah Bell has been betraying the gang by acting as an informant for the Pinkertons. He returns to Dutch to inform him of this, but Dutch turns on Arthur and the newly returned John. As Pinkertons invade the camp, Arthur and John flee. Arthur begs John to return to his family. The vengeful Micah soon ambushes him, and Dutch intervenes. Arthur convinces Dutch to abandon Micah and leave. If the player has high honor, Arthur succumbs to his injuries and disease, dying peacefully while watching the sunrise; with low honor, Micah executes him.

Reception 

The character of Arthur Morgan received critical acclaim. Giant Bombs Alex Navarro wrote that the thoughtful portrayal of Arthur's internal conflicts possessed humanity often lacking in other Rockstar games. Kyle Atwood from LevelSkip called him a "character of tragedy and, most importantly, humanity". Kirk Hamilton at Kotaku opined that Arthur initially seemed unremarkable, but became more intriguing because of Clark's performance. Writing for Ars Technica, Daniel Starkey felt that, while Arthur's story can be considered "poignant and memorable", some may see it as a typical tale about a "'bad man' who isn't necessarily in control".

Tom Power of GamesRadar+ believed that the account of Arthur's life in Red Dead Redemption 2 reflected a Shakespearean tragedy, with various chapters of the game representing the five stages of grief. Electronic Gaming Monthlys Nick Plessas found his journey to be "far more redeeming" than that of John Marston in Red Dead Redemption, noting that Arthur's shortcomings evoked a sense of sympathy. Javy Gwaltney's review for Game Informer echoed this sentiment, describing the arc as a "fantastic take on memento mori and how ruthlessly messy and complex redemption can be". Conversely, Eurogamer author Martin Robinson considered Arthur to be less compelling than John, thus confusing his experience of the narrative.

The Guardians Paul Walker-Emig thought that Arthur's notebook made him appear "like a real person with his own inner life, rather than a puppet who does our bidding". Peter Suderman, writing for The New York Times, found that the player connected with Arthur "because his choices are, in fact, your own". Laurence Mozafari of Digital Spy submitted that Arthur had perfectly encapsulated the feeling of the Old West. VentureBeat writer Dean Takahashi praised Clark's contribution for adding immersion to the game and depth to his character. Luke Reilly at IGN hailed Arthur's voice as having an "infectious authenticity".

For his role, Clark won Best Performance at The Game Awards 2018, and was a runner-up for the same category at PlayStation Blog; he also received nominations at the 15th British Academy Games Awards, NAVGTR Awards, and New York Game Awards. The character of Arthur was nominated at the 22nd Annual D.I.C.E. Awards and Italian Video Game Awards. In November 2021, GamesRadar+ ranked Arthur 29th on its list of iconic video game characters, citing the character's ability to "bring a nourishing sense of humanity to almost everything he does". In May 2022, GamingBolt named Arthur the best video game protagonist of all time, praising the writing, Clark's performance, and the character's personal narrative and relationships.

References 

Action-adventure game characters
Fictional American people in video games
Fictional bank robbers
Fictional career criminals
Fictional characters with respiratory diseases
Fictional criminals in video games
Fictional gang members
Fictional hunters in video games
Fictional gunfighters in video games
Fictional marksmen and snipers
Fictional mass murderers
Fictional people from the 19th-century
Male characters in video games
Orphan characters in video games
Red Dead Redemption 2
Video game characters introduced in 2018
Video game protagonists
Western (genre) bounty hunters
Western (genre) gunfighters
Western (genre) outlaws